This is a list of all songs recorded by Alison Moyet.

Songs

As a featured artist

References

Lists of songs recorded by British artists
British music-related lists